The Gangneung Stadium is a multi-purpose stadium in Gangneung, South Korea. It is currently used mostly for football (American English: soccer) matches. The stadium has a capacity of 22,333 spectators and was opened in 1984. It is the home ground of Gangneung City FC and Gangwon FC (since 2009).

It is located within the Gangneung Olympic Park, one of the main sites of the 2018 Winter Olympics.

External links
 Gangneung Sports Facilities Management Center 
 World Stadiums

Football venues in South Korea
Gangwon FC
Ulsan Hyundai FC
Multi-purpose stadiums in South Korea
Sports venues in Gangneung
Sports venues completed in 1984
K League 2 stadiums